Lerna was a region in classical Greece.

Lerna may also refer to:

 Lerna, Illinois, village
 Lerna Regio, region on Io
 Lerna (moth), genus
 Lerna (municipal unit), former municipality in Greece